The following is a list of presidents of the Landtag of Saarland.

Presidents of the Landesrat des Saargebiets
The presidents of the Landesrat (Regional Council) were not elected by the Regional Council of the Saar Territory, but deliberately determined by the Governing Commission, which again was appointed by the League of Nations. The first president appointed was not even elected as a representative of the Regional Council.

President of the Legislative Assembly of Saarland

Presidents of the Landtag

Sources
Landtag des Saarlandes | Die Präsidenten der saarländische Volksvertretungen von 1922 bis heute

Notes

Landtag Presidents
Saarland Landtag 
Landtag Presidents
Lists of political office-holders in Germany